Sara Bennett is a British visual effects artist best known for her work on Harry Potter and the Chamber of Secrets (2002), Harry Potter and the Prisoner of Azkaban (2004), Harry Potter and the Goblet of Fire (2005), Doctor Who (2005), Merlin (2008), Jonathan Strange & Mr Norrell (2009), Skellig (2009), The Martian (2015) and Ex Machina (2015).

In 2016, Bennett received an Academy Award for her work on the film Ex Machina in the category of Best Visual Effects. She shared the award with Andrew Whitehurst, Paul Norris, and Mark Williams Ardington.

References

External links

Living people
Special effects people
Year of birth missing (living people)
Place of birth missing (living people)
Best Visual Effects Academy Award winners
WFTV Award winners